The 1934–35 season was Aberdeen's 30th season in the top flight of Scottish football and their 31st season overall. Aberdeen competed in the Scottish League Division One and the Scottish Cup.

Results

Division One

Final standings

Scottish Cup

References

AFC Heritage Trust

Aberdeen F.C. seasons
Aber